Obora Hvězda (Star Game Reserve) is a  forest park (formerly a royal game reserve) in Prague, the capital of the Czech Republic, which is now protected as a natural monument.

The first mention of the forest, originally called Malejov, dates from 993, when duke Boleslaus II donated it to the newly established Břevnov Monastery. It was transformed into a walled game reserve during rule of Ferdinand I in the mid-16th century.  The current name (hvězda being Czech for "star") derives from the Star Summer Palace, a 16th-century building, which stands in middle of the forest. The Battle of White Mountain took place on fields in the W/SW vicinity of the game reserve in 1620.

Nowadays part of the site is designated as a Natura 2000 protected site due to the presence of the narrow-mouthed whorl snail (Vertigo angustior).

The site is home to several bird species including the Middle Spotted Woodpecker.

External links

 Obora Hvězda (The Hvězda Game Preserve) Natural Monument
 Prague's Green Spaces: Quick guide to visiting Obora Hvězda
 Czech Society for Ornithology: Birding in Prague

Special Areas of Conservation
Natural monuments in the Czech Republic
Forests of the Czech Republic
Parks in Prague